Emeline Island is a conspicuous rocky island rising to over  in the Aitcho group on the west side of English Strait in the South Shetland Islands, Antarctica. The area was visited by early 19th century seal hunters.

The feature is named after the American sealing vessel Emeline under Captain Jeremiah Holmes, which visited the South Shetlands in 1820–21 and operated from nearby Clothier Harbour.

Location

See also
Aitcho Islands
Composite Antarctic Gazetteer
List of Antarctic islands south of 60° S
SCAR
South Shetland Islands
Territorial claims in Antarctica

Map
L.L. Ivanov et al. Antarctica: Livingston Island and Greenwich Island, South Shetland Islands. Scale 1:100000 topographic map. Sofia: Antarctic Place-names Commission of Bulgaria, 2005.

References

External links
SCAR Composite Antarctic Gazetteer

Islands of the South Shetland Islands